The 2005–06 Heineken Cup was contested by 24 teams from England, France, Ireland, Italy, Scotland and Wales, divided into six pools of four teams each. Each team would play the others in their pool on a home-and-away basis, with four points awarded for each win and two points for a draw. Bonus points were also awarded to teams who scored four or more tries in a match and/or lost by a margin of seven points or fewer. The team with the most points in each group at the end of the pool stage qualified directly for the knockout phase, joined by the two-second-placed teams with the most points.

Pool 1

Pool 2

Pool 3

Pool 4

Pool 5

Pool 6

Seeding and runners-up

See also
2005–06 Heineken Cup

References

Pool Stage
Heineken Cup pool stages